Kaghan may refer to:

 Khagan or Qaghan, a Turkic and Mongolian title
 Kaghan Valley, a valley in the Khyber-Pakhtunkhwa Province of Pakistan
 Kaghan (town), a town in Khyber-Pakhtunkhwa, Pakistan
 Theodore Kaghan, American civil servant and journalist

See also 
 Kagan (disambiguation)
 Kahgan, a village in Iran